Beverly is a village in Washington County, Ohio, United States. It is part of the Parkersburg-Marietta-Vienna, WV-OH Metropolitan Statistical Area.  The population was 1,313 at the 2010 census.

History
Beverly was established by the Ohio Company in 1789.

A post office called Beverly has been in operation since 1838. The village is named after Beverly, Massachusetts, the native home of a first settler.

Geography
Beverly is located at  (39.548790, -81.636030).

Beverly is located by the Muskingum River.

State Routes 60, 83, and 339 converge at Beverly.

Climate

Demographics

2010 census
As of the census of 2010, there were 1,313 people, 545 households, and 338 families living in the village. The racial makeup of the village was 97.2% White, 0.3% African American, 0.2% Asian, and 2.4% from two or more races. Hispanic or Latino of any race were 0.5% of the population.

There were 545 households, of which 28.8% had children under the age of 18 living with them, 41.8% were married couples living together, 15.6% had a female householder with no husband present, 4.6% had a male householder with no wife present, and 38.0% were non-families. 33.8% of all households were made up of individuals, and 15.9% had someone living alone who was 65 years of age or older. The average household size was 2.32 and the average family size was 2.94.

The median age in the village was 41.2 years. 23.7% of residents were under the age of 18; 8% were between the ages of 18 and 24; 22.9% were from 25 to 44; 25.5% were from 45 to 64; and 19.9% were 65 years of age or older. The gender makeup of the village was 46.2% male and 53.8% female.

2000 census
As of the census of 2000, there were 1,282 people, 556 households, and 351 families living in the village. The population density was 1,757.6 people per square mile (678.1/km2). There were 604 housing units at an average density of 828.1 per square mile (319.5/km2). The racial makeup of the village was 99.38% White, 0.31% African American, 0.08% Native American, 0.08% Asian, 0.00% Pacific Islander, 0.00% from other races, and 0.16% from two or more races. 0.23% of the population were Hispanic or Latino of any race.

There were 556 households, out of which 26.3% had children under the age of 18 living with them, 53.6% were married couples living together, 7.7% had a female householder with no husband present, and 36.7% were non-families. 32.7% of all households were made up of individuals, and 15.5% had someone living alone who was 65 years of age or older. The average household size was 2.23 and the average family size was 2.81.

In the village, the population was spread out, with 21.6% under the age of 18, 7.4% from 18 to 24, 24.9% from 25 to 44, 23.5% from 45 to 64, and 22.6% who were 65 years of age or older. The median age was 43 years. For every 100 females there were 87.2 males. For every 100 females age 18 and over, there were 84.1 males.

The median income for a household in the village was $32,798, and the median income for a family was $39,853. Males had a median income of $35,556 versus $19,196 for females. The per capita income for the village was $20,597. 9.8% of the population and 8.4% of families were below the poverty line. 10.9% of those under the age of 18 and 10.1% of those 65 and older were living below the poverty line.

Education
Beverly is home to the Fort Frye School District. Its high school and junior high school are located in the village, plus an elementary school; two other elementary schools are located in Lowell and Lower Salem.

Beverly has a public library, a branch of the Washington County Public Library.

Notable person
 John Sherman, American political leader, briefly worked and lived in Beverly.

See also
Waterford, sister city across the river.

References

External links
  Beverly Public Library
  Photos of Beverly
  John Sherman link

Villages in Washington County, Ohio
Villages in Ohio
Muskingum River